The Dream Merchants is an American novel written by Harold Robbins and published in 1949. Set in the early 20th century, the book is a "rags-to-riches" story of a penniless young man who goes to Hollywood and builds a great film studio. A former Universal Studios employee, author Harold Robbins based the main character on Universal's founder, Carl Laemmle. With the Hollywood history in the backdrop, it is a love story.

Adaptation
In 1980, the book was made into a two-part miniseries. It was directed by Vincent Sherman.

Primary cast
Mark Harmon  :   Johnny Edge
Vincent Gardenia  :   Peter Kessler
Morgan Fairchild  :   Dulcie Warren
Brianne Leary  :   Doris Kessler
Robert Picardo  :   Mark Kessler
Eve Arden  :   Coralee
Kaye Ballard  :   Esther Kessler
Morgan Brittany  :   Astrid James
Red Buttons  :   Bruce Benson
Robert Culp  :   Henry Farnum
Howard Duff  :   Charles Slade
José Ferrer  :   George Pappas
Robert Goulet  :   Craig Warren
David Groh  :   Rocco Salvatore
Carolyn Jones  :   Vera
Fernando Lamas  :   Conrad Stillman
Ray Milland  :   Lawrence Radford
Jan Murray  :   Murray Tucker
Don "Red" Barry  :   Captain Casey

External links

Notes

Novels by Harold Robbins
1949 American novels
1980s American television miniseries
1980 American television series debuts
1980 American television series endings
Films based on American novels
Television shows based on American novels
Operation Prime Time
Alfred A. Knopf books
Hollywood novels